The Kinsmen Sports Centre is a multi-purpose sport and recreation facility located in Edmonton, Alberta, Canada. The land surrounding the facility is called Kinsmen Park, part of Edmonton's city-long North Saskatchewan River valley parks system. Its namesake is the Kinsmen, a service organization.  The Kinsmen Sports Centre is owned by the City of Edmonton and operated by the Community Services Department. It was the competition site for the 2005 World Masters Games diving, swimming, synchronized swimming and table tennis.

Kinsmen Field House 
The field house was opened January 3, 1968, and was intended to be the first phase of a multifaceted Kinsmen Village that would eventually include an Olympic-size swimming pool and an indoor/outdoor performing arts theatre. At the time of its creation, it was unique among such facilities in Canada and remains the only such facility in North America which is open to general use.

Kinsmen Field House once hosted concerts by many famous artists, including Led Zeppelin & Vanilla Fudge (1969), Frank Zappa (1971), Manfred Mann & KISS (1974), Kansas (1975), Queen (1975), Wishbone Ash (1975), Max Webster (1977),  Rush (1975, 1976 & 1977), The Lillo's (1978), Bob Marley (1979), Gary Numan (1980), Motorhead (1981),  Ozzy Osbourne (1981), Girlschool, Iron Maiden and The Scorpions (1982), The Clash (1982), Billy Idol w/Platinum Blonde (1984), KISS (1985) and Uriah Heep (1986).

Kinsmen Aquatic Centre 
In 1976, the Kinsmen Aquatic Centre was added to the facility to serve the 1978 Commonwealth Games.
Also added in 1992 was the Keltie Byrne Fitness Centre.

References 

1968 establishments in Alberta
Sports venues in Edmonton
Music venues in Edmonton
1978 Commonwealth Games venues
Swimming venues in Canada
Water polo venues
Kin Canada
Sports venues completed in 1968
Commonwealth Games swimming venues